"The Sexuality of Bereavement" is a song by death/doom metal band My Dying Bride. The single was only available to the Peaceville Collectors Club Series members. The Collectors Club was eventually disbanded because it had too few members. After this point, the band discontinued production of EPs, up until 2006.

"The Sexuality of Bereavement" was originally recorded for the Turn Loose the Swans, but was not included in the final track listing. It was written as a sequel to "The Bitterness and the Bereavement" from As the Flower Withers.

The song appears as a bonus track on the limited edition digipak of their 1995 album The Angel and the Dark River and on its subsequent 1996 expanded reissue as well as several remastered reissues and the most recent vinyl pressing, despite being an outtake from Turn Loose.

It was released in 2003 on the reissued versions of both Turn Loose the Swans and Trinity; it appears on all issues of the latter including the first pressing, always in replacement of "Transcending (Into the Exquisite)".

Track listing
 "The Sexuality of Bereavement"  – 8:06
 "The Crown of Sympathy" (Remix)  – 7:08

Personnel
 Aaron Stainthorpe - vocals
 Andrew Craighan - guitar
 Calvin Robertshaw - guitar
 Adrian Jackson - bass
 Martin Powell - violin, keyboard
 Rick Miah - drums

References

1994 singles
My Dying Bride songs
1994 songs